The Reformed Great Church or Great Reformed Church in Debrecen is located in the city of Debrecen. It stands in the city centre, between Kossuth square and Kálvin square. It is the symbol of the Protestant Church in Hungary, and it is because of this church that Debrecen is sometimes referred to as "the Calvinist Rome". With a ground space of 1500 m² it is the largest Protestant church in Hungary. It also has the largest bell of all Hungarian Protestant churches. The Great Church was built between 1805 and 1824 in the neoclassical style.

History

A church already stood here in the Middle Ages, but it burnt down. St. Andrew Church, a Gothic hall church was built in its place between 1297 and 1311. Its area was about 16×46 meters. This church burnt down in 1564. In 1626 the already Protestant citizens of Debrecen started to build the St. Andrew Church again. With the support of George I Rákóczi construction was finished in 1628. In 1640-1642 a tower was constructed and a large bell – about 300 kg, made of Austrian cannonballs – was placed in it. In 1707, during the freedom fight led by Francis II Rákóczi the church suffered heavy damages from the imperial troops. The church burnt down on June 11, 1802, during the great fire which destroyed most of Debrecen.

The construction of the Great Church began on April 8, 1805. It was designed by Mihály Péchy, but the plans were altered several times during the construction, causing much frustration to the builders. The original plan featured a church with a cross-shaped ground plan and a large dome, but the plan was discarded, mainly due to financial reasons.

The western tower was finished by 1818, the eastern tower on August 6, 1821. The towers are 61 meters high. Originally a dome was planned to crown the building, this was not built, but when the construction was finished, the facade seemed unattractive with the large empty space between the towers, so in 1823/24 the facade was slightly modified, using the plans of Károly Rábl. The tower roofs feature Baroque elements. A nice panorama can be seen from the left (western) tower. The old Rákóczi bell, restored after the fire, is in this tower too.

Architecture

The main nave of the church is 55 m long and nearly 15 m wide, the transept is 38 m long and more than 14 m wide. Similar to other Protestant churches, the inside walls are painted white. The interior is 21 meters high. The church accommodates about 5000 people (with 3000 seats).

The Great Church also has historical significance: during the Hungarian Revolution of 1848 Lajos Kossuth made the Hungarian Declaration of Independence here  on April 14, 1848, and was elected governor of the country here. The armchair in which he sat can be viewed in the church.

The church has two organs, one of them is in the southern part, above the main entrance. This is a new, electronic organ with resonance pipes, three manuals and 52 registers, built by Péter Albert in 1981. The older, Classical organ is behind the pulpit. It was built in 1838 by Jakob Deutschmann. It is a cabinet organ with 3 manuals and 43 registers.

External links

 Photo gallery
 Live Webcam

Debrecen
Churches in Hungary
Churches completed in 1824
19th-century Presbyterian churches
Buildings and structures in Debrecen
Tourist attractions in Hajdú-Bihar County
Reformed Church in Hungary
19th-century churches in Hungary
Classicist architecture